Jerre is a given name and may refer to:

Jerre Denoble (1923–2011), American outfielder who played for the All-American Girls
Jerre Levy (born 1938), American psychologist
Jerre Mangione (1909–1998), American writer
Jerre Noe (1923–2005), American computer scientist
Jerre Stockton Williams (1916–1993), United States federal judge